The Shire of Rodney was a local government area in the Goulburn Valley region, about  north of Melbourne, the state capital of Victoria, Australia, located between Kyabram and Shepparton.

History

Rodney was initially part of the Waranga Road District, which was incorporated in 1863, and became a shire two years later. The Shire of Rodney was severed and incorporated on 19 March 1886. Following the secession of the Town of Kyabram on 1 April 1954, the eastern part of the shire, adjoining Shepparton and centered on Mooroopna (which had become home to the Ardmona fruit cannery in 1922), unsuccessfully attempted to secede from Rodney, a move driven by the town's Chamber of Commerce.

On 18 November 1994, the Shire of Rodney was abolished, and along with the City of Shepparton, the Shire of Shepparton and some neighbouring districts, was merged into the newly created City of Greater Shepparton. The Kyabram hinterland and some land around Lake Waranga were transferred to the newly created Shire of Campaspe.

Wards

The riding boundaries of Rodney were changed and renamed in 1988. This brought about a general spill of the council, and at an election in August of that year, the following nine councilors were elected:
 North Riding; Councilors Ted Davis, John McKellar and Cheryl Phillips 
 Central Riding; Councilors Tom Perry, John Gray and Kevin Walker
 South Riding; Councilors Kevin Ryan, Andrew Crawford and Ian Coldwell

Towns and localities
 Byrneside
 Coomboona
 Dhurringile
 Gillieston
 Girgarre East
 Harston
 Merrigum
 Mooroopna
 St Germains
 Tatura*
 Toolamba
 Undera

* Council seat.

Population

* Estimate in the 1958 Victorian Year Book.

References

External links
 Victorian Places - Rodney Shire

Rodney